The Fresno Buddhist Temple (now known as Mrauk Oo Dhamma) is a three-story Buddhist temple in Fresno, California, United States.

History
Built in 1920, the temple was built by Japanese  Issei to replace a wooden temple built in 1902. The temple features gilded columns, marble stairs, detailed woodwork and a Spanish tile roof. The entire building was built by local people of Japanese ancestry. 

During World War II the building was closed due to the internment of people of Japanese ancestry. This included United States citizens. After re-opening, the building served as a hostel and an education center, before eventually reopening as a temple, again. 

Sometime during the temple's history, a bodhi tree was planted behind the annex building from a seedling descended from the Jaya Sri Maha Bodhi tree in Sri Lanka, which is said to descended from the original Mahabodhi Tree in Bodh Gaya, under which Gautama Buddha found enlightenment.

The Japanese congregation prospered in the years following, building a new property in North Fresno in 2010, and put their downtown property up for sale in 2011.

A group of Burmese-American physicians raised $750,000 to purchase the property in 2018 to serve the spirtual needs of the growing Burmese community in Fresno, and renamed the temple Mrauk Oo Dhamma in honor of their head monk, Mrauk Oo Sayadaw.
As the new Burmese owners were moving into the property, they discovered a Burmese statue of Buddha in a storeroom. Apparently the mayor of a Burmese town visited Fresno in 1961 and presented it to the city as a gift. Mayor Selland gave it to the temple as the only Buddhist temple in town. Both the previous Japanese owners and the new Burmese owners agreed it should stay with Burmese congregation and that it was an auspicious sign for sale of the property.

References

External links
History of the Temple from the Mrauk Oo Dhamma website
History of the Japanese congregation from the Fresno Buddhist Temple website

20th-century Buddhist temples
Asian-American society
Buddhist temples in California
Buddhist Churches of America
Burmese American
Japanese-American culture in California
Religious buildings and structures in Fresno, California